29 Minutes of Fame is a British satirical celebrity quiz series which aired on BBC One on Fridays in early 2005. The show was presented by comedian Bob Mortimer. The show's two team captains were Jo Brand and Alistair McGowan, they were also joined by a regular panelist Sean Lock.

Format
The format of the show was similar to another BBC quiz program, Have I Got News for You, but without the politics. Each week three celebrities joined the regular cast on the two panels. The questions were based around comical elements of other celebrity figures of the time.

Guests

Episode 1
(21 January 2005)
Amanda Donohoe
Stephen Fry
Jason Wood

Episode 2
(28 January 2005)
Graeme Garden
Lee Mack
Jason Wood

Episode 3
(4 February 2005)
Tony Hawks
Debbie McGee
Ricky Tomlinson

Episode 4
(11 February 2005)
Jennie Bond
Tony Hawks
Ben Miller

Episode 5
(18 February 2005)
Tony Livesey
Matt Lucas
Arabella Weir

Episode 6
(25 February 2005)
Eddie Izzard
Carol Smillie
Ricky Tomlinson

External links

BBC television game shows
British panel games
2005 British television series debuts
2005 British television series endings
2000s British game shows
2000s British satirical television series
English-language television shows